The Imuruk Basin (Imaaġruk in Iñupiaq) is an approximately ,  long shallow estuary located on the Seward Peninsula in the U.S. state of Alaska. The estuary's drainage basin covers about one quarter of the peninsula. The basin is fed by the Kuzitrin, Kruzgamepa, Agiapuk, and Cobblestone Rivers and is drained by the Tuksuk Channel, which empties into Grantley Harbor (Pacific Ocean).

The Imuruk Basin was a strategic waterway for early Iñupiat by providing accessibility to the Bering Sea from the Seward Peninsula's interior.

See also
Imuruk Lake

References

Estuaries of Alaska
Lagoons of Alaska
Bodies of water of Nome Census Area, Alaska
Bodies of water of the Seward Peninsula